NHS Evidence is a government-funded resource of information, research, evidence and best practice guidance for health, social care and public health.

It is aimed at health- and social care workers and designed to help students, specialists, clinicians, managers, commissioners, and health providers make better and quicker evidence-based decisions.
The service is provided by the National Institute for Health and Clinical Excellence since its foundation in April 2009 as part of Lord Darzi's strategy for the future of the NHS, High-Quality Care for All, which identified a clear need for better access to information for NHS staff to deliver the highest quality care. Its budget 2009/10 was £19,433,000, raised to £24,438,000 in 2010/11.

NHS Evidence allows users to search over 100 health and social care databases simultaneously, including The Cochrane Library, British National Formulary and the National Institute for Health and Clinical Excellence. It comprises an increasing number of 'specialist collections', covering a diversity of topics, from clinical areas such as 'Cancer' or 'Eyes and Vision' to issues relating to 'cross-cutting' topics relating to specific user groups, such as 'ethnicity' with information about the particular healthcare needs of minority ethnic groups, and evidence about inequalities in health attributable to cultural, religious or 'racial' differences.  Other 'crosscutting' topics include 'later life' and child health, while more specialist collections relate to differing professional or management areas of health care, such as commissioning, screening, and complementary medicines.  These specialist collections are led by specialists in their fields and apply carefully agreed quality assurance controls before accessioning resources for general use.

Resources

Information available via NHS Evidence includes clinical and public health guidance, government policy, patient information, drug information, systematic reviews, primary research and grey literature.

There are six 'lots', or categories of data available, defined by the NICE Framework. These are:

NHS Evidence – Quality and Productivity
helps the NHS identify efficiency savings that can be made while continuing to deliver high-quality care.
Linking quality and productivity is an important challenge for the NHS if it is to reach its target of £15–20 billion in efficiency savings by 2014.
The Department of Health's Quality and Productivity project has been designed to help NHS organisations make the necessary savings without compromising the quality of care and services. NHS Evidence – Quality and Productivity is part of this initiative. It gives access to evidence on how to improve quality and productivity within the NHS, including examples of innovative local practices.
Content covers the best available evidence, tools and techniques, measurement, case studies and policy on all aspects of innovation and improvement.
NHS Evidence – Quality and Productivity, provides users with real examples of how staff are improving quality and productivity across the NHS.

NHS Evidence Accreditation
Organisations achieving high standards in producing guidance can be identified on NHS Evidence by a seal of approval called an Accreditation Mark.
An independent advisory committee takes decisions about which organisations are awarded the Accreditation Mark based on rigorous analysis and assessment.
Organisations are awarded the Accreditation Mark for three years. Their performance is reviewed regularly.

Eyes on Evidence is a free monthly e-bulletin which provides updates on major new evidence as it emerges with an explanation about what it means for current practice.

See also
The Norwegian Electronic Health Library (Helsebiblioteket.no) is a similar public website for health professionals and students.

References

External links
 NHS Evidence
 National Institute for Clinical Excellence (NICE)

British medical websites
Evidence-based medicine
National Health Service